Rockcorry Railway Station was on the Cootehill Branch of the Dundalk and Enniskillen Railway in the Republic of Ireland.

The Dundalk and Enniskillen Railway opened the station on 10 October 1860.

It closed on 10 March 1947.

Routes

References

Disused railway stations in County Monaghan
Railway stations opened in 1860
Railway stations closed in 1947